Sohn Won-yil (May 5, 1909 in Nampo  February 15, 1980) was a South Korean naval vice admiral best known for being the first Chief of Naval Operations (CNO) of the Republic of Korea Navy. As one of the founding members of the Republic of Korea Navy, Sohn is generally regarded as the founder of the South Korean navy.

Career

Shortly after Korea was liberated from the Empire of Japan on August 15, 1945, Sohn Won-yil, a former merchant mariner and son of the independence activist Sohn Jung-do, led the Maritime Affairs Association.  The Association evolved into the Marine Defense Group on November 11, 1945 (later became Navy Foundation Day) and later became the Korean Coast Guard, which was formed in Jinhae. After the new Republic of Korea government was established on August 15, 1948, the Korean Coast Guard has formally renamed the Republic of Korea Navy, and Sohn became the first Chief of Naval Operations of the ROK Navy on September 5, 1948.

After relieved from the service, he was appointed as the fifth Minister of National Defense, and the first ambassador to West Germany.

Legacy
In honor of Sohn, the ROKS Sohn Won-yil (SS 072), the first of Sohn Won-yil class submarines, was commissioned in 2007, named after him.

References 

 Biography at the War Memorial Korea official website

1909 births
1980 deaths
People from Nampo
Chiefs of Naval Operations (South Korea)
National Defense ministers of South Korea
Ambassadors of South Korea to West Germany